"It's Just About Time" is a song originally recorded by Johnny Cash. It was written for him by Jack Clement.

The song was recorded by Cash in July 1958 during his final sessions for Sun Records, and released as a single (Sun 309, with "I Just Thought You'd Like to Know", another song from the same sessions, on the opposite side) in November.

Background 

Yet, Peter Lowry notes (in his book I've Been Everywhere: A Johnny Cash Chronicle) that "compared to recent singles this could be seen as a flop chartwise, with a stay of just one week in the [country] charts at the start of 1959."

The flip side, "I Just Thought You'd Like to Know," reached #85 on the Billboard Hot 100 and didn't enter the country chart at all.

Charts

References 

Johnny Cash songs
1958 singles
Songs written by Jack Clement
Sun Records singles
1958 songs